Tununguá is a town and municipality in Boyacá Department, Colombia, part of the subregion of the Western Boyacá Province. The municipality borders the department of Santander in the north and east and the Boyacá municipalities Pauna (south and west) and Briceño (south).

History 
Tununguá is located in the valley of Chiquinquirá, a town  to the east and the area was inhabited before the Spanish conquest by the Muisca (east) and Muzo.

Tununguá is named after cacique Tununguá, who was said to be a descendant of the children of Fura and Tena, from the Muzo myth Furatena.

Tununguá formed a larger municipality with neighbouring Briceño and was properly founded on November 30, 1962.

Economy 
Around 85% of the economy of Tununguá comes from agriculture; main products coffee, guayaba, bananas, yuca, oranges, mandarines, lemon and others at smaller scale such as guanábana, peanuts and cacao. The remaining 15% comes from livestock farming.

References

External links 

Municipalities of Boyacá Department